Machen is a surname often but not always of Welsh origin (derived from the town Machen). Notable people with the surname include:
 Alwyn Machen (1901–1960), British trade union leader
 Arthur Machen (1863–1947), Welsh author and mystic, best known for his supernatural, fantasy and horror fiction
 Bernie Machen (born 1944), American academic, President of the University of Utah (19992003) and of the University of Florida (from 2003)
 Eddie Machen (1932–1972), American boxer
 Hervey Machen (1916–1994), U.S. Representative from Maryland 196569
 John Gresham Machen (1881–1937), American Presbyterian theologian
 Ronald Machen (born 1969), American lawyer, U..S. Attorney for the District of Columbia 201015
 Thomas Machen (–1614), English merchant who was three times mayor of Gloucester
 William H. Machen (1832–1911), Dutch painter and teacher who relocated to America
 Willis Benson Machen (1810–1893), U.S. Senator from Kentucky 187273

See also 
 Machen (disambiguation)
 Machin (disambiguation)
 Franz Machon (1918–1968), German submariner
 Mackem, an informal name for a person from Sunderland, England; and for the local accent, and for a follower of the local football team

Surnames of Welsh origin